Władysław Dominik Derdacki (born 30 March 1882, Sokal – died 10 November 1951, Gliwice) was a Polish architect active mainly in the city of Lviv and towns and cities of the Kingdom of Galicia and Lodomeria.

Life and work
In 1900, he graduated from secondary school and began to study at the Lviv Polytechnic at the Faculty of Engineering. After one year, he changed the subject and pursued studies at the Faculty of Architecture, which he graduated from with honours in 1907. Since 1907, he worked at the architectural company of Jan Levinsky where, together with Witold Minkiewicz, they created a number of projects. In 1911, Derdacki and Minkiewicz established their own architectural company. He was a member of the "Zespół" Architecture Association as well as the Polish Polytechnic Society in Lviv (Polskie Towarzystwo Politechniczne we Lwowie). In 1914, he was appointed a member of the examination board of the Faculty of Architecture of the Lviv Polytechnic. In 1924, he was awarded the title of a professor. In 1922-1923 and 1927-1930 he served as dean of the Faculty of Architecture.

In 1946, after the postwar population transfers, he settled in Gliwice where he worked as Head of the Department of Civil Engineering at the Silesian University. He engaged in an active academic work, researching efficient dwelling houses planning and published numerous architecture-related articles in professional journals.

Selected works
In Jan Levinsky's company:
A complex of tenement houses on Leon Sapieha Street in Lviv (currently Stepan Bandera Street 2-4-6), 1909
Tenement house at St. Nicholas Street in Lviv (currently Mykhailo Hrushevsky Street 10), 1910
Tenement house on Casimir Pulaski Street in Lviv (currently Parkowa Street 14), 1910
In partnership with Minkiewicz:
Pedagogical Society House on Chorążczyna Street in Lviv (currently Dzhokhar Dudayev Street 17), 1911
Tenement House on Snopkowska Street in Lviv (currently Vasyl Stus Street 5/7), 1912
Tenement House at Wałowa Street 13 in Lviv, 1912
Tenement house on John III Sobieski Street in Lviv (currently Rohatyniets Brothers' Street 14), 1912
Galician Credit Bank on Wały Hetmańskie Avenue (currently Prospect Svobody 17), 1911-1912
Villa on Jan Tarnowski Street in Lviv (currently Myron Tarnavsky Street 71), 1913-1922
Project of the new seat of the Faculty of Mechanics on Kornel Ujejski Street in Lviv (currently Mykola Ustynanovich Street), 1913, the construction of the building was carried out according to Witold Minkiewicz's project in 1924
Competition project of St. Anne's Church (2nd place)
In collaboration with other architects:
The "Falcon" Polish Gymnastic Society House in Husiatyn, Busk and Skalat
First prize for the project of the seat of Towarzystwo Ziemskie in Przemyśl, 1912
First prize for the project of the seat of the city council in Berezhany, 1912
Project of the interior design of the Kraków Hotel in Lviv, 1914
Functionalist villa at Cetnerówka Street 18 in Lviv
Krzyżewskis' Villa on Żyżyńsks Street in Lviv (currently Volodymyr Kubiyovych Street 41), 1925
Building of the Ukrainian Catholic University in Lviv, 1924-1926

Gallery

See also
History of Lviv
Teodor Talowski
Zygmunt Gorgolewski

References

1882 births
1951 deaths
Architects from Lviv
People from the Kingdom of Galicia and Lodomeria
Polish Austro-Hungarians
Lviv Polytechnic alumni
Victims of post–World War II forced migrations